Denizcan Temizkan (born 24 January 2000) is a Turkish chess player who holds the title of FIDE Master (FM).

Biography
Denizcan Temizkan is a multiple medalist of the Turkish Youth Chess Championships, including two consecutive silver medals in the U13 and U14 age groups (2013, 2014).
Denizcan Temizkan repeatedly represented Turkey at the European Youth Chess Championships and World Youth Chess Championships in different age groups. In 2008, in Herceg Novi, he won the European Youth Chess Championship in the U08 age group. In 2009, Denizcan Temizkan won a silver medal in the World School Chess Championship in the U09 age group. In 2013, he won the European School Chess Championship in the U13 age group.

References

External links
 
 
 

2000 births
Living people
Turkish chess players
Chess FIDE Masters